Along may refer to:
 Along, Arunachal Pradesh, a town in India
 Along Airport, an airport in the state of Arunachal Pradesh, India
 Along people, a Chinese ethnic group

See also
 Hạ Long Bay, a UNESCO World Heritage Site and popular travel destination in Quảng Ninh Province, Vietnam; commonly called baie d'Along by Francophones